Event storming is a workshop-based method to quickly find out what is happening in the domain of a software program.
Compared to other methods it is extremely lightweight and intentionally requires no support by a computer.
The result is expressed in sticky notes on a wide wall.
The business process is "stormed out" as a series of  domain events which are denoted as orange stickies.
It was invented by Alberto Brandolini in the context of domain-driven design (DDD).
Event storming can be used as a means for business process modeling and requirements engineering.
The basic idea is to bring together software developers and domain experts and learn from each other.
To make this learning process easier, event storming is meant to be fun.
The name was chosen to show that the focus should be on the domain events and the method works similar to brainstorming or agile modeling's model storming.

Requirements
It is important for an event storming workshop to have the right people present.
This includes people who know the questions to ask (typically developers) and those who know the answers (domain experts, product owners).

The modeling will be placed on a wide wall with a roll of paper rolled out on it.
The sticky notes will be placed on this paper.
You will require at least 5 distinct colors for the sticky notes.

Steps

The first step is to find the domain events and write them on orange sticky notes.

When all domain events are found the second step is to find the command that caused each of the domain events. Commands are written on blue notes and placed directly before the corresponding domain event.

In the third step the aggregates within which commands are executed and where events happen are identified.
The aggregates are written in yellow stickies.

The concepts gathered during an event storming session fall into several categories, each with its own colour of sticky note:

 An event that occurs in the business process. Written in past tense.
  A person who executes a command through a view.
  Processes a command according to business rules and logic. Creates one or more domain events.
  A command executed by a user through a view on an aggregate that results in the creation of a domain event.
  Cluster of domain objects that can be treated as a single unit.
  A third-party service provider such as a payment gateway or shipping company.
 A view that users interact with to carry out a task in the system.

Example notes
These are examples, these would be different for different organizations.

Domain events

Actors

Commands

Aggregates

External systems

Views

Errors

Example
Users
CreateAccount
AccountCreated
Signup

Result
As a result, the business process can be seen on the modeling space.
But more important is the knowledge that was built in the minds of the participants.

References

External links
 https://miro.com/miroverse/event-storming/

Collaboration
Group problem solving methods
Software architecture
Software design